The 2021–22 Latvian–Estonian Basketball League, known as Paf Latvian–Estonian Basketball League for sponsorship reasons, was the 4th season of the Latvian–Estonian Basketball League, the combined top basketball division of Latvia and Estonia.

The season began on 1 October 2021. Regular season ended on 26 March 2022. The play-off quarterfinal series were being played after the regular season but the champion was crowned in a Final Four tournament.

Competition format 
The regular season includes two rounds, followed by the quarter-finals and Final 4. The league’s management followed the development of the epidemiological situation in both countries and if necessary, the playoff system may be changed. However, no changes were applied, except for some rescheduled regular season games.

Teams 

14 teams, 8 from Estonia and 6 from Latvia, contested the league in the 2021–22 season.

Venues and locations

Personnel and kits

Regular season

League table

Results

Play-offs
In quarter-finals teams play against each other must win two games to win the series. Quarter-finals started on 29 March and ended on 4 April, with three of four winners being teams without home-court advantage. Semi-finals and final in a Final Four format was held on 9–10 April at the Arēna Rīga in Rīga, Latvia.

Quarter-finals 

|}

Games

Final 4

Final Four was held on 9–10 April at the Arēna Rīga in Rīga, Latvia.

Semi-finals

Third place game

Final

Statistics 
As of April 10, 2022.

Points

Rebounds

Assists

Awards

Regular season MVP

Final Four MVP

Final Four All Star Five

MVP of the Month

Estonian and Latvian clubs in European competitions

Local Leagues 
After the conclusion of season, each country played its own national championship play-offs. On May 19, VEF Rīga won its 9th Latvian championship. On May 26, Pärnu Sadam won their first ever Estonian championship

See also
2021–22 KML season

References

External links
Official website
Estonian Basketball Association 
Latvian Basketball Association 

Latvia-Estonia
Latvian–Estonian Basketball League
2021–22 in Estonian basketball
2021–22 in Latvian basketball